Dendrophleps is a genus of tussock moths in the family Erebidae.

Species
The following species are included in the genus.
Dendrophleps chionobosca Collenette, 1955
Dendrophleps cretacea Holland, 1999
Dendrophleps lobipennis Swinhoe, 1892
Dendrophleps semihyalina Hampson, 1893

References

Natural History Museum Lepidoptera genus database

Lymantriinae
Moth genera